Sultan Mahmud Bridge or Jambatan Sultan Mahmud (Jawi: جمبتن سلطان مهمود) is a bridge in Kuala Terengganu, Terengganu, Malaysia, which crosses Terengganu River. Constructed in 1988, the bridge was officially opened by the late of Sultan of Terengganu, Almarhum Sultan Mahmud Al-Muktafi Billah Shah on 11 March 1990. Toll collection for the bridge was abolished in 1999 by the then PAS state government following an election promise.

Sultan Mahmud International Bridge Run

The Sultan Mahmud International Bridge Run is the annual bridge run that is held on September every year. It is organised by the Terengganu State Government, the Terengganu Amateur Athletic Association (POAT) and the Terengganu State Tourism Action Council (MTPNT).

See also
 Jalan Tengku Mizan
 Federal Route 65

References

Bridges completed in 1990
Bridges in Terengganu
Former toll bridges in Malaysia